The 2007 Special Olympics World Summer Games were held in Shanghai, China.

Venues

A select list of venues used during the games:

Shanghai Pudong Swimming Arena
Shanghai Stadium
Shanghai Indoor Stadium
Fudan University
Qizhong Forest Sports City Arena

Events 
 Aquatics
 Athletics 
 Badminton
 Basketball 
 Bocce 
 Bowling 
 Cycling 
 Equestrian 
 Floor hockey
 Football
 Golf 
 Gymnastics 
 Judo 
 Kayaking
 Powerlifting 
 Roller skating 
 Sailing 
 Softball 
 Table tennis 
 Team handball 
 Tennis
 Volleyball
 Cricket
 Dragon boat
 Dragon Lion
 MATP

Young Athletes introduction 
Concluding it pilot run in 2006, The Special Olympics officially introduced Young Athletes, a sports program for children aged 2–7 with intellectual disabilities. It was designed to get the children exposed and interested in sports before they are eligible to compete in the Special Olympics. It was tested in 11 other countries and over 10,000 children participated.

Revenue and expenses 
The Games made a total of $101,663,833 in revenue, gains, and other financial support. It was a $16,898,416 increase compared to the year before. Total expenses for the year were $101,010,125, another increase from 2006, this time worth $19,841,738.

Founder receives award 
Special Olympics founder, Eunice Kennedy Shriver was awarded with the Minerva Award for Lifetime Achievement two weeks after the closing ceremony on October 23. She won the award for her contributions not only to the Special Olympics, but for efforts to help people with disabilities. The award is named after the Roman goddess Minerva and serves as a way to honor women who have sparked change in their communities, states, and nations.

See also 
2008 Summer Olympics
2009 Summer Deaflympics

References

External links
 2007 Summer Special Olympics official site

Special Olympics World Summer Games
International sports competitions hosted by China
Special Olympics
Special
Multi-sport events in China
Sports competitions in Shanghai
2000s in Shanghai